The Right to Live is a 1921 British silent drama film written by, directed by and starring A.E. Coleby. The screenplay concerns a Cockney fishmonger who tracks down his estranged niece who is an aspiring actress and then loses his family's savings gambling on a trotting race.

Main cast
 A.E. Coleby - Bill Rivers
 Phyllis Shannaw - Marjorie Dessalar
 Peter Upcher - Sir Robert Martindale
 Marguerite Hare - Mrs. Rivers
 Henry Nicholls-Bates - Grandpa Rivers

References

External links
 

1921 films
British silent feature films
1921 drama films
British drama films
British black-and-white films
1920s English-language films
1920s British films
Silent drama films